The Package is a short story by Kurt Vonnegut, first published on 26 July 19, 1952 in Collier's weekly, and later in Bagombo Snuff Box in 1999.

Plot

The story concerns very successful retired businessman Earl Fenton and his wife, who worked their entire lives to get where they are. The day they return from a trip around the world and move into their brand new house with all the modern conveniences, an old friend from college, Charlie, arrives in town and calls from a local hotel. He has come into town to visit Fenton. The two went to college, where Charlie was one of the rich kids, while Fenton had to work hard, in looking back on the time Fenton perceived that his need to work his way through college made him a "second class" person in his fraternity, but when questioned by his wife could not remember any specific things that the "rich" fraternity brothers said or did. Now Fenton, who is very proud of what he has accomplished in his life, wants to show this to his former college frat brother. He takes the opportunity that comes up to show off his new house and talk about his success. Later his wife points out that Charlie doesn't appear as well-off as Fenton and a discussion ensue about the possible causes of this downfall, all of which reflect poorly on Charlie. After Fenton spends considerable time bragging about his current state he and his wife come up with an excuse to ask Charlie to reconsider their invitation to stay at the house, Charlie thanks him for his hospitality and leaves. Later, Fenton discovers that Charlie spent his fortune, and dedicated his life to treating poor people in China, until he was jailed and then kicked out of the country. This discovery caused Earl and his wife to regret the way they treated Charlie and wish for a way to start the day over and do a better job of it.

References

Short stories by Kurt Vonnegut
1952 short stories